Diplocephaloides is a genus of Asian dwarf spiders that was first described by R. Oi in 1960.  it contains three species: D. saganus, D. uncatus and the recently-described D. falcatus.

See also
 List of Linyphiidae species

References

Araneomorphae genera
Linyphiidae
Spiders of Asia